Prescott is a surname of English origin; habitational name from any of the places so called, in southwestern Lancashire (now Merseyside), Gloucestershire, Oxfordshire, Shropshire, and Devon, all of which are named from Old English preost ‘priest’ + cot ‘cottage’, ‘dwelling’. The surname is most common in Lancashire, and so it seems likely that the first of these places is the most frequent source. It is also present in Ireland, being recorded there first in the 15th century.

List
Notable people with the surname include:

 Abel Prescott, Jr. (1749–1775), American patriot
 Abraham Prescott (1789–1858), American luthier
 Alan Prescott (1927–1998), English rugby league footballer
 Albert Benjamin Prescott (1832–1905), American chemist
Barbara L. Prescott (born 1951) American author, editor, and educator
 Benjamin F. Prescott (1833–1895), American lawyer, newspaper editor, and politician
 Breidis Prescott (born 1983), Colombian boxer
 Carol Prescott, American psychologist and gerontologist
 Charles Prescott (disambiguation), multiple people, including:
Charles John Prescott (1857–1946), English born Australian army chaplain, Methodist minister and headmaster
Charles Ramage Prescott (1772–1859), merchant, noted horticulturalist and political figure in Nova Scotia
Charles Y. Prescott (born 1938), American particle physicist
 Dak Prescott (born 1993), American football quarterback
 Edward C. Prescott (1940-2022), American Nobel prize-winning economist
 George Prescott (1913–1988), American politician from Michigan
 H. F. M. Prescott (1896–1972), English author, academic and historian
 Henry Prescott (1783–1874), officer of the British Royal Navy
 James W. Prescott (born c. 1930), American developmental psychologist
 John Prescott (disambiguation), multiple people, including:
John Prescott (born 1938) British politician, Deputy Prime Minister of the United Kingdom
John Prescott (died 1412), (c. 1327 – 1412), English MP for Exeter, Totnes and Devon
John B. Prescott (born 1940), Australian CEO of BHP
John Robert Victor Prescott, Australian geographer
 Kathryn Prescott (born 1991), English actress
 Norm Prescott (1927–2005), American film producer
 Paul Prescott (born 1986), English rugby league footballer
 Peter Prescott (disambiguation), multiple people, including:
Peter Prescott (musician) (born 1957), American drummer from Boston
Peter Prescott (barrister) (born 1943), English barrister, Queen's Counsel and Deputy High Court Judge
Peter S. Prescott (died 2004), American author, book reviewer, and critic
 Rebecca Minot Prescott (1742–1813), second wife of Roger Sherman
 Richard Prescott (1725–1788), British officer during the American Revolutionary War
 Robert Prescott (c. 1726 – 1815), British soldier and colonial administrator
 Robert Prescott (actor), American actor
 Samuel Prescott (1751–1777), American who completed Paul Revere's midnight ride
 Samuel Cate Prescott, MIT dean and pioneer food technologist
 Stef Prescott, Filipina actress
Warren P. Prescott (born 1951) American lawyer and educator
 William Prescott (1726–1795), colonel in American Revolutionary War, Battle of Bunker Hill
 William H. Prescott, American historian
 W. W. Prescott (William Warren Prescott, 1855–1944), educator and administrator in the Seventh-day Adventist Church

Fictional characters
 Jim Prescott, from the TV series 24
 Nathan Prescott, from the video game Life Is Strange
 Sidney Prescott, the protagonist of the Scream movie series
 Jessie Prescott, the titular character from the Disney Channel series Jessie

References

English toponymic surnames